The Battle of Van Creek was a small engagement on February 11, 1779, near Elberton, Georgia, during the American Revolutionary War. About 100 Patriot militia men sought to stop a Loyalist force of about 600 men from crossing the Savannah River to rendezvous with a British force which had recently captured Augusta, Georgia. The Loyalist force was able to flank and defeat the Patriot militia and cross the river. However, the Loyalists lost about 100 men, almost all through desertions, and suffered its own defeat and further losses a few days later at the Battle of Kettle Creek.

References

Van Creek
Van Creek
Van Creek
Van
1779 in the United States
Van Creek
1779 in Georgia (U.S. state)